Xishaping Township is an rural township in Sangzhi County, Zhangjiajie, Hunan Province, China.

Administrative division
The township is divided into 12 villages, the following areas: Yunhe Village, Zhuangjiaping Village, Jiangxiping Village, Maopo Village, Jiulong Village, Taiziping Village, Xishaping Village, Chaonanping Village, Zhoujiaya Village, Xujiaqiao Village, Bapipo Village, and Zhangjiatai Village (云合村、庄家坪村、江西坪村、茅坡村、九龙村、太子坪村、细沙坪村、朝南坪村、周家亚村、徐家桥村、八皮坡村、张家台村).

References

External links

Former towns and townships of Sangzhi County